is a 26-episode anime produced by Bandai Visual, NAS, and TV Tokyo. It was animated by Ashi Productions and it aired in Japan between May 3, 1999, and October 25, 1999.

It is loosely based on original characters and the Cybaster mech from the video game series Super Robot Wars.

Plot
The story is set in 2040 after a disaster happens in Tokyo in 2029. The main character Ken Andoh joins up with a company designated to clean up Tokyo, called DC. After a mysterious robot begins attacking the DC cleanup crews, the organization starts a process of militarization with Ken learning of the secrets it hides.

Characters

New recruit of DC.

New recruit of DC.

Bian's daughter.
 / 

A mystery man who is piloting Cybaster.

Next chief of DC after Bian's death.

Shu's assistant.

Development

Reception
Carlo Santos of Anime News Network was critical of the series, stating that he felt its plot was generic and something that had been done before, while also offering some praise for the character designs. Don Houston of DVD Talk felt the series got better in later parts and praised the robot fights.

References

External links
 

1999 anime television series debuts
Anime spin-offs
Discotek Media
Geneon USA
Mecha anime and manga
Fiction set in 2040
Ashi Productions
TV Tokyo original programming